Antoni Zygmund (December 25, 1900 – May 30, 1992) was a Polish mathematician. He worked mostly in the area of mathematical analysis, including especially harmonic analysis, and he is considered one of the greatest analysts of the 20th century. Zygmund was responsible for creating the Chicago school of mathematical analysis together with his doctoral student Alberto Calderón, for which he was awarded the National Medal of Science in 1986.

Biography
Born in Warsaw, Zygmund obtained his Ph.D. from the University of Warsaw (1923) and was a professor at Stefan Batory University at Wilno from 1930 to 1939, when World War II broke out and Poland was occupied. In 1940 he managed to emigrate to the United States, where he became a professor at Mount Holyoke College in South Hadley, Massachusetts. In 1945–1947 he was a professor at the University of Pennsylvania, and from 1947, until his retirement, at the University of Chicago.

He was a member of several scientific societies. From 1930 until 1952 he was a member of the Warsaw Scientific Society (TNW), from 1946 of the Polish Academy of Learning (PAU), from 1959 of the Polish Academy of Sciences (PAN), and from 1961 of the National Academy of Sciences in the United States. In 1986 he received the National Medal of Science.

In 1935 Zygmund published in Polish the original edition of what has become, in its English translation, the two-volume Trigonometric Series. It was described by Robert A. Fefferman as "one of the most influential books in the history of mathematical analysis" and "an extraordinarily comprehensive and masterful presentation of a ... vast field". Jean-Pierre Kahane called the book "The Bible" of a harmonic analyst. The theory of trigonometric series had remained the largest component of Zygmund's mathematical investigations.

His work has had a pervasive influence in many fields of mathematics, mostly in mathematical analysis, and particularly in harmonic analysis. Among the most significant were the results he obtained with Calderón on singular integral operators. George G. Lorentz called it Zygmund's crowning achievement, one that "stands somewhat apart from the rest of Zygmund's work".

Zygmund's students included Alberto Calderón, Paul Cohen, Nathan Fine, Józef Marcinkiewicz, Victor L. Shapiro, Guido Weiss,  Elias M. Stein and Mischa Cotlar. He died in Chicago.

Mathematical objects named after Zygmund
 Calderón–Zygmund lemma
 Marcinkiewicz–Zygmund inequality
 Paley–Zygmund inequality
 Calderón–Zygmund kernel

Books
Trigonometric Series (Cambridge University Press 1959, 2002)
Intégrales singulières (Springer-Verlag, 1971)
Trigonometric Interpolation (University of Chicago, 1950)
Measure and Integral: An Introduction to Real Analysis, With Richard L. Wheeden (Marcel Dekker, 1977)
Analytic Functions, with Stanislaw Saks (Elsevier Science Ltd, 1971)

See also
 Calderón–Zygmund lemma
 Zygmunt Janiszewski
 Marcinkiewicz–Zygmund inequality
 Paley–Zygmund inequality
 List of Poles
 Centipede mathematics

References

Further reading
Kazimierz Kuratowski, A Half Century of Polish Mathematics: Remembrances and Reflections, Oxford, Pergamon Press, 1980, .

External links

Mount Holyoke biography

1900 births
1992 deaths
People from Warsaw Governorate
20th-century Polish  mathematicians
Mathematical analysts
National Medal of Science laureates
Members of the Polish Academy of Learning
University of Warsaw alumni
Mount Holyoke College faculty
University of Pennsylvania faculty
University of Chicago faculty
Academic staff of Vilnius University
Polish emigrants to the United States
Functional analysts
Members of the Polish Academy of Sciences
Members of the United States National Academy of Sciences